Chronomancy is divination of the best time to do something, the determination of lucky and unlucky days, especially popular in ancient China.

The term "chronomancy", stemming from the Greek word chronos (meaning time), and the word manteia (meaning divination) is also used in fiction to refer to a school of magic involving supernatural manipulation of time.

Role in modern fantasy
In modern fantasy role-playing games, such as Dungeons and Dragons and other games set in the Forgotten Realms universe, chronomancy refers to a school of magic related to moving through and manipulating time.

References

Divination
Chinese mythology